Metz is an unincorporated community in Waushara, and Winnebago counties, Wisconsin, United States. Metz is located 6.5 miles south of Fremont, in the towns of Bloomfield, and Wolf River.

Notes

Unincorporated communities in Wisconsin
Unincorporated communities in Waushara County, Wisconsin
Unincorporated communities in Winnebago County, Wisconsin